Greenbrier State Park is a public recreation area located on South Mountain,  northeast of Boonsboro in Washington County, Maryland, USA. The state park has camping, hiking trails, and a  man-made lake. It is managed by the Maryland Department of Natural Resources.

History
Greenbrier and Janes Island State Park were created in 1963. Between 1964 and 1978, the Maryland General Assembly authorized funding of over $2 million for land acquisition and development of Greenbrier's camping and picnic areas, beach, day-use facilities, parking areas, interpretive center, roads, and trails.

Activities and amenities
The park offers camping, fishing, boat launch and rentals, swimming, hiking, picnicking, mountain biking and hunting. The park's visitor center is open year-round, its nature center seasonally.

Trails
Greenbrier State Park contains ten maintained trails: Bartman Hill Trail, Big Red Trail, Camp Loop Trail, Copperhead Trail, Green Trail, Marked Mile, Rock Oak Fire Trail, Snelling Fire Trail, Water Tank Trail, and Yellow Trail. All trails are open to hikers, and most are open to mountain bikes. In addition, the Appalachian Trail crosses a corner of the park and can be accessed from the Bartman Hill Trail.

Lake
Greenbrier Lake is a 42-acre, man-made lake with  beach and swimming area that gradually reaches a depth of six feet. Fishing for trout, bass, or bluegill is permitted on the lake, with a state-issued license required for those 16 or older.

In the news
In 1995, two rare albino deer were spotted in the park. In 2008, the park received a federal grant for $130,000 to build concrete culverts to allow box turtles to safely cross Keadle Road within the park. The pilot program was the first of its kind in the United States.

References

External links

Greenbrier State Park Maryland Department of Natural Resources
Greenbrier State Park Map Maryland Department of Natural Resources

State parks of Maryland
Parks in Washington County, Maryland
South Mountain Range (Maryland−Pennsylvania)
State parks of the Appalachians
Protected areas established in 1963
IUCN Category III
1963 establishments in Maryland